Terminal is a medical thriller written by Robin Cook. The novel peeps into the boom and curse of biotechnology.

Plot summary
Dr. Randolph Mason, leader of the research team at Miami's Forbes Medical Centre makes medical history by claiming a 100% remission rate for a particular type of cancer called medulloblastoma. Newly qualified doctor Sean Murphy arrives at Forbes determined to expand his own work in oncogenes, but is frustrated by Dr. Mason and Dr. Levy, his boss at Forbes, who deny him permission. Unknown to Sean, his girlfriend Janet Reardon follows him to Miami. She wants to confront him about his devotion to her and discuss their future, a topic avoided by Sean at all times. Thrown into the equation are Tom Widdicomb, a housekeeper at the Forbes Hospital, who keeps his dead mother in a Freezer at home and 'helps' breast cancer patients escape life since that is what his mother died of, and Sushita Industries, the Japanese financial backers of Forbes.

While Sushita launches an effort to 'invite' Sean to  Tokyo to determine whether he is a potential threat to their investment by using Tanaka Yamaguchi, Tom is certain that Janet is there at Forbes to spy on him as she suspects his hand in the death of the breast cancer patients and should therefore be silenced as the previous nurse was, for interfering in his affairs.

Dr. Mason meanwhile learns of Sean's past as an entrepreneur and successful seller of a biotechnology firm and sets Sterling, a 'consultant' (in reality, an industrial espionage expert), on Sean's tail. Driven by his own idealism, Sean decides to look into the 100% remission of medulloblastoma on the sly (with help from Janet in procuring the medicine samples and patients charts). Helen Cabot, an ex-patient of Sean's, dies in Boston; Sean and Janet steal Helen's brain from a funeral home. Sean decides to go to Naples with Janet to visit Malcolm Betancourt, a beneficiary of the treatment provided by Forbes. Harris catches Tom  trying to assault Janet. Sterling foils an attempt by Yamaguchi to kidnap Sean and Janet and convinces him to back off. Sean and Janet escape to Key West where Forbes has its Diagnostic lab.

Sean finally discovers the secret behind the 100% remission: the Institute itself created the cancer using transformed St. Louis encephalitis virus and also invented an antibody to the disease. The Institute procured Social Security numbers and other identifying details of wealthy people and their dependents, and as opportunities arose from those people undergoing surgeries or being on IV therapy, infected with them. Because the virus was encephalotropic, it manifested with early neural symptoms in the infected patients, in the form of seizures and convulsions. The infected people, once they were completely cured of the disease, were usually willing to donate large sums to the Forbes. Sean and Janet however end up with them facing the charges of conspiracy, grand larceny, burglary, burglary with deadly weapon, assault, kidnapping, mayhem, and mutilation of a dead body. They are saved by the intervention of Sean's lawyer brother Brian.

This book heavily deals with the controversial issues of the time.

Novels by Robin Cook
American thriller novels
1993 American novels
Medical novels
G. P. Putnam's Sons books